Gianni Ronconi (born 4 November 1952) is an Italian hurdler who competed at the 1976 Summer Olympics for the Italian team.

References

External links
 

1952 births

Living people
Athletes (track and field) at the 1976 Summer Olympics
Italian male hurdlers
Olympic athletes of Italy
Sportspeople from the Province of Mantua